Averill can refer to:

People
 Alan Averill, Irish musician
Alfred Averill (1865–1957), 5th Anglican Bishop of Auckland 
Earl Averill (1902–1983), American Major League Baseball player
John T. Averill (1825–1889), American Civil War officer and U.S. congressional representative from Minnesota
Roger Averill (1809–1883), 31st Lieutenant Governor of Connecticut
Sarah Wildes (Salem witch trials) (Sarah Averill Wildes, 1627–1692), convicted of witchcraft during the Salem witch trials 
Thomas Fox Averill (born 1949), novelist and academic from Topeka, Kansas

Places
Averill, Minnesota
Averill, Vermont
Averill Park, New York

See also
Averell, a given name and surname